Heaven on Earth is an ancient and active tenet for a possible world to come. 
The phrase may also refer to:

Film, television and theatre
 Heaven on Earth (1927 American film), a film starring Conrad Nagel
 Heaven on Earth (1927 German film), a comedy film directed by Alfred Schirokauer and Reinhold Schünzel 
 Heaven on Earth (1931 film), a film based on the 1929 novel Mississippi by Ben Lucien Burman
 Heaven on Earth (1935 film), an Austrian film
 Heaven on Earth (musical), a 1948 Broadway musical by Jay Gorney
 Heaven on Earth (1960 film), an Italian film of 1960
 Heaven on Earth (1987 film), a UK TV drama written by Margaret Atwood
 Heaven on Earth (play), a 1989 play by Robert Schenkkan
 Heaven on Earth: The Rise and Fall of Socialism, a 2005 PBS documentary
 Heaven on Earth (2008 film), a 2008 Canadian film by Deepa Mehta

Music 
 "Heaven on Earth", a 1926 song by George and Ira Gershwin from the stage musical Oh, Kay!
 "Heaven on Earth", a 1956 song by The Platters
 Heaven on Earth (Larry Young album), 1968
 Heaven on Earth (duo), an English husband and wife duo formed in 1983
 "Heaven on Earth", a song from the 1986 Keith LeBlanc album Major Malfunction
 Heaven on Earth (Belinda Carlisle album), 1987
 "Heaven Is a Place on Earth", a 1987 single from the aforementioned album
 Heaven on Earth (James Carter album), 2009
 "Heaven on Earth", a song from the 2007 Britney Spears album Blackout
 "Heaven on Earth (The Things We've Got to Do)", a song from the 2010 Alphaville album Catching Rays on Giant
 "Heaven on Earth", a 2018 song by Stars Go Dim
 "H.O.E. (Heaven on Earth)", a song from the 2020 Yo Gotti album Untrapped

Literature
 Heaven on Earth: Dispatches From America's Spiritual Frontier, a 1992 book by Michael D'Antonio
 Heaven on Earth: The Varieties of the Millennial Experience, a 2011 book by Richard Landes
 Heaven on Earth: A Journey Through Shari'a Law, a 2012 book by Sadakat Kadri

Other
 Maharishi Heaven on Earth Development, a for-profit real estate developer founded in 1988